Public art displayed in Shanghai include:

 Bund Bull
 Hehe Xiexie
 May Thirtieth Movement Monument
 Statue of Charlie Chaplin
 Statue of Chen Yi
 Statue of Ma Zhanshan
 Statue of Zhang Side

Jing'an Sculpture Park 
Jing'an Sculpture Park has the following works on display:
 Colors of Happiness
 Elemental Spring: Harmony
 Flying Colors
 Girouette Monumentale
 Horse
 Large Parrot Screams Color
 Music Power
 Ostrich Hide and Seek
 Red Beacon
 Urban Fox

See also

 List of public art in Hong Kong

Culture in Shanghai
Shanghai
Shanghai-related lists